The following is the list of islands in the territory of Tanzania.

By geographic zone

Lake Victoria 
 Nabuyongo Island
 Ukerewe Island 
 Ukara Island
 Saanane Island
 Rubondo Island

Indian Ocean 
 Mwambamwamba Island
 Ulenge Island
 Kirui Island
 Gozini Island
 Gulio Island
 Kwale Island
 Karange Island
 Sangi Island
 Funguni Island (sand bank), Pangani District 
 Bongoyo Island
 Fungu Yasini Island
 Kilwa Kisiwani
 Mafia Island
 Maziwi Island, Pangani District
 Mbudya Island
 Okuza Island
 Pangavini Island
 Songo Songo Island
 Songosongo Islands
 Okuza Island
 Nyuni Island
 Toten Island
 Yambe Island, also known as Jambe Island
 Zanzibar Archipelago
 Bawe Island
 Changuu
 Chumbe Island
 Fundo Island
 Latham Island
 Pemba Island
 Tumbatu
 Unguja, also known as Zanzibar
 Uzi Island
 Vundwe Island

References

Tanzanie
Islands